Little Posbrook is a hamlet in south Hampshire, England. At the 2011 census the population of the hamlet was included in the Titchfield ward of Fareham Borough Council.

References

Villages in Hampshire